The Muzaffarpur–Sitamarhi section is a railway line connecting Muzaffarpur to Sitamarhi in the Indian state of Bihar. The  line passes through the plains of North Bihar.

History
The foundation for this project was laid by the then railway minister, Ram Vilas Paswan, in 1997. When Nitish Kumar succeeded he sanctioned funds for it in 2001.

Project and construction
It took 16 years to complete the 63 km-long Muzaffarpur–Sitamarhi broad-gauge railway line. The project cost Rs 550 crore though the initial estimate was Rs 250 crore. The railway was completed from Runni Saidpur to Sitamarhi in April 2011. The remaining section between Muzaffarpur and Runni Saidpur took another two years due to civil objections.

The first train Muzaffarpur–Sitamarhi Passenger left  on 27 March 2013

Stations

Trains
Until December 2014, 2 pairs of passenger trains and 3 pairs of Express trains were running in the Muzaffarpur–Sitamarhi section.

From 13 July 2014, Sitamarhi–Delhi Anand Vihar Terminal Lichchavi Express was diverted to run via Muzaffarpur in the Muzaffarpur–Sitamarhi section which earlier ran via Darbhanga→Samastipur→Muzaffarpur. Now the 14006/14005 Lichchavi Express directly runs between Sitamarhi→Muzaffarpur.

DEMU Trains
 75207/75208 Muzaffarpur–Sitamarhi–Samastipur Passenger
 75255/75256 Muzaffarpur–Darbhanga Passenger
 75215/75216 Raxaul-Patliputra Fast Passenger

Express Trains
 14008/14007 Sadbhavana Express (Raxaul–Delhi via Muzaffarpur & Sitamarhi)
 14018/14017 Sadbhavana Express (Raxaul–Delhi via Muzaffarpur & Sitamarhi)
 14006/14005 Lichchavi Express (Sitamarhi–Delhi Anand Vihar Terminal via Muzaffarpur)
 13123/13124 Sitamarhi- Sealdah Express

Speed limit
The Muzaffarpur–Sitamarhi section of Muzaffarpur–Gorakhpur line (via Hajipur, Raxaul and Sitamarhi) is not an A-Class line of Indian Railways. So maximum speed is restricted to 100 km/h, as there is single BG non-electrified line between Muzaffarpur Junction and Sitamarhi Junction which was completed in 2013.

Sidings and workshops
 Kanti Thermal Power Station, Muzaffarpur
 Bharat Wagon Engineering Limited, Muzaffarpur

See also
 Barauni–Gorakhpur, Raxaul and Jainagar lines
 Samastipur–Muzaffarpur section
 Barauni–Samastipur section
 
 East Central Railway zone

References

|

5 ft 6 in gauge railways in India
Railway lines in Bihar

Railway lines opened in 2013